Dubrovo is a rural locality (a village) in Bereznikovskoye Rural Settlement, Sobinsky District, Vladimir Oblast, Russia. The population was 68 as of 2010.

Geography 
Dubrovo is located 14 km south of Sobinka (the district's administrative centre) by road. Shepeli is the nearest rural locality.

References 

Rural localities in Sobinsky District